The Education of Auma Obama is a 2011 German documentary on the life of Barack Obama's half-sister Auma Obama. It won the Best Diaspora Documentary Award at the Africa Movie Academy Awards. It was directed by Branwen Okpako.

References

External links

German documentary films
Best Diaspora Documentary Africa Movie Academy Award winners
2011 films
Biographical documentary films
2011 documentary films
Documentary films about women
2010s German films